Alexander Odyssey is a Canadian documentary film, directed by Pedro Pires and released in 2019. The film centres on Alexandre Demard, a man who is at a new crossroads in his life 15 years after first experiencing a mental breakdown which led to his being diagnosed with schizophrenia.

The film premiered at the Quebec City Film Festival on September 15, 2019, before premiering commercially on September 20.

The film received three Canadian Screen Award nominations at the 8th Canadian Screen Awards in 2020, for Best Feature Length Documentary, Best Cinematography in a Documentary (Pires) and Best Editing in a Documentary (Pires, Sophie Leblond and Sylvia de Angelis). It also received four Prix Iris nominations at the 22nd Quebec Cinema Awards, for Best Documentary, Best Cinematography in a Documentary, Best Editing in a Documentary and Best Sound in a Documentary. It won the Canadian Screen Award for Best Editing.

References

External links 
 

2019 films
2019 documentary films
Canadian documentary films
Documentary films about schizophrenia
Films directed by Pedro Pires
French-language Canadian films
2010s Canadian films